Jan Vencálek (1598-????) was a Bohemian Renaissance-era composer for the lute and voice.     Considered one of the masters in arrangement for lutes, Vencálek's compositions were showcased in Prague during the reign of Rudolph II.

External links
 Radio Prague.
 Official site of the Czech Republic.

Czech composers
Czech male composers
Year of death unknown
1598 births